The Oklahoma Warriors are a Tier II junior ice hockey team in the North American Hockey League's South Division. The Warriors play their home games at Blazers Ice Centre in Oklahoma City, Oklahoma.

History
On October 15, 2019, the North American Hockey League (NAHL) announced that they had approved the membership application submitted by Robbie Hockey LLC, an entity owned and operated by Mary Anne Choi for a team in Wichita Falls, Texas, and that the team would start play in the 2020–21 season as a member of the South Division. On November 26, 2019, the name Warriors name was selected out of Warriors, Flames, Reign, and Falcons via a name-the-team contest. On April 14, 2020, the Warriors announced their inaugural head coach as Garrett Roth, a former assistant coach with the Bismarck Bobcats and Aberdeen Wings.
 
On April 4, 2022, the Warriors and city of Wichita Falls mutually agreed to part ways at the end of the 2021-2022 NAHL season. The Warriors will relocate to the Blazers Ice Centre in Oklahoma City, Oklahoma beginning in the 2022–2023 season.

Season-by-season records

References 
 warriors leaving Wichita Falls https://www.texomashomepage.com/sports/local-sports/wichita-falls-warriors-relocating-sources-say/?

External links
Official website
NAHL website

North American Hockey League teams
Ice hockey clubs established in 2019
2019 establishments in Texas
Sports in Wichita Falls, Texas
Ice hockey teams in Texas